is a metafictional, ballet-themed magical girl, dramatic-musical anime television series broadcast in Japan, the first season in 2002 and the second in 2004. The characters are from the TV series and a manga series derived from the anime television series.

Plot summary
Princess Tutu follows Duck (Ahiru in the original anime and manga, meaning "duck"), a duck who was transformed into a young girl and takes ballet at a private school.  She becomes enamoured of her mysterious schoolmate Mytho, and transforms into a Swan-like ballerina—Princess Tutu—to restore his shattered heart. Mytho's girlfriend Rue transforms into Princess Kraehe to frustrate Tutu's efforts, and Mytho's protective friend Fakir discourages Mytho's burgeoning emotions. When it becomes apparent that Duck, Rue, Mytho, and Fakir are meant to play out the characters in a story by a long-dead writer named Drosselmeyer, they resist their assigned fates and fight to keep the story from becoming a tragedy.

Characters

Main characters
 age ~14, (estimated), Height 4”11“ in, is a friendly, kind-hearted Lovesick duck who was turned into a pre-teen girl by Drosselmeyer by a magical pendant. Like a duck, she is easily excitable, clumsy, and talkative. If Duck removes the pendant or quacks while talking, she transforms back into a duck, and must touch water while wearing the pendant to return to her human form.  The pendant also allows Duck to transform into . As Princess Tutu, Duck is wise and graceful. According to Drosselmeyer's writing, Duck/Tutu would turn into a speck of light and vanish if she confessed her love to Mytho. In the anime, despite her feelings for Mytho, she develops a close relationship with Fakir as the story progresses and they help each other out in their shared desire to protect Mytho and restore his heart. While it's never explicitly confirmed if she actually does grow to have feelings for him, she does muse that Fakir gives her strength. In the manga, her feelings for Mytho are left open-ended, with Rue competing for his heart. Duck's name in the manga is Ahiru Arima, which is retained in the English adaptation. 
 age ~15, (estimated. Mytho is around age 15 in appearance but is never-aging in the real world.), height 5”3” in, is the noble and kind Prince and protagonist of Drosselmeyer's story "The Prince and the Raven". He sacrificed himself to protect the weak and needy by shattering his own heart to seal away the monstrous Raven. As Tutu restores his emotions, he finds himself both afraid of and drawn to her, holding a desire for her to return the rest of his heart and know what she thinks of him. He is later corrupted by The Raven's blood that Kraehe put on one of his heart shards, and so attempts to steal girls' hearts as a sacrifice to The Raven. While Mytho's true personality does try to fight back against the corruption, as it progresses he becomes increasingly unstable and verbally abusive to Rue. In the end however, with her help he overcomes The Raven's blood when the last heart shard is returned. Ultimately, because of this, he chooses Rue to be his princess. At the end of the anime, Mytho's real name is revealed to be Siegfried, which, incidentally, is the name of the Prince in the ballet Swan Lake, from which the series borrows many plot elements.  
 age ~16, (estimated), height ”5”5 in, is Mytho's roommate and a talented ballet dancer in his own right. Initially he is extremely possessive of Mytho, displaying a need to be in control of everything the prince does and discouraging his emotions as they are gradually restored in a forceful and almost abusive manner. He also acts rude or hostile towards anyone who appears to be growing close to Mytho, including Rue, Duck, and especially Princess Tutu. Eventually Duck learns that Fakir's harsh behavior came about only because he wanted to protect Mytho from repeating the tragic events of the past, which he felt he could only do by preventing Mytho from regaining his heart. Duck however helps him realize that Mytho wants his heart back. Fakir is the reincarnation of the Knight in Drosselmeyer's story, who died to protect the Prince; Fakir was even born with a birthmark on his chest that resembles a scar, which lies in the same place as the wound that killed the Knight. It's later revealed that Fakir is a descendant of Drosselmeyer and inherited his ability to bend reality with his writing. He tried using his power to stop a raven attack when he was young, but failed and his parents were killed. This made him shut away the knowledge of this power until Duck convinces him to try again. When he chooses to pick up the pen once more, he eventually realizes that he can only successfully write stories about Duck. By the end of the series he has fallen in love with Duck, which is exemplified through his promise to stay by her side forever. 
 age ~15, (estimated), height ”5”1”in, is an advanced ballet student, and greatly admired by Duck and the other pupils. She is aloof, and only Duck dares to approach her and make friends. She has loved Mytho since childhood after he defended her from crows, and now takes advantage of his apathy to pretend they are a couple. Like Duck, she also has a magical princess alter ego, the daughter of the Raven. Her jealously interferes with Tutu's attempts to restore Mytho's heart, fearing that he will fall in love with someone else. Her father, The Raven, uses her as a means to revive him, but in the end she learns she is not a raven, but rather a human girl kidnapped as a baby during The Raven's attack on the town. When it appears Mytho will give himself to The Raven, Rue sacrifices herself instead, admitting she had always loved Mytho. Touched by her selfless act, Mytho regains his heart and rescues her, asking her to be his princess. In the manga her name is Rue Kuroha, and is much colder and more cruel. Kraehe (also spelled Krähe) is the German word for "crow".

Antagonists
 is the monster from Drosselmeyer's story The Prince and The Raven and is one of the main antagonists of the anime. Unlike Drosselmeyer, The Raven was mentioned in the first half of the anime and only appears in the second half of the anime. Mytho shattered his heart to seal up The Raven, who then requires the sacrifice of young, beautiful hearts which he will eat to restore his form. He stole Rue from her parents as a child and raised her as his daughter, calling her Princess Kraehe. The Raven is cruel and abusive to Rue, and orders her to corrupt Mytho with The Raven's blood. When Rue's love for the Prince eventually lets him break free from the tainted heart shard, he rescues her and together they defeat The Raven. The character does not appear in the manga, albeit brief mention by Edel. 
 is an elderly man with a long, white beard, and though he is long dead is one of the main antagonists of the anime.  Author of The Prince and The Raven, he is bored with happy stories so he enjoys watching Duck, Fakir, Mytho, and Rue struggle with the tragic fates he wrote for them. He posthumously influences their lives via a machine in the clock tower. Drosselmeyer died after the angry townsfolk cut off his hands to stop him from warping reality with his writing, but he managed to bring the writing machine into existence by writing in his own blood. His name comes from the godfather of the children in the opening of Tchaikovsky's other work The Nutcracker: one Christmas, Drosselmeyer gives a wooden doll to his niece Clara, who took a liking and accepts the doll compared to the other children who rejects its ugliness. He is not present in the manga.

Supporting characters
 is a life-sized wooden puppet with a street organ and a tray of creatively named jewelry. She gives cryptic advice and tells stories to Duck. Drosselmeyer created Edel to act as narrator in his stead and originally without her own emotions, though she ends up developing them after interacting with Duck. She sacrifices herself in a fire to save Fakir and to provide a light for guiding Mytho and Princess Tutu to safety during the finale of the first season. She then asks them to dance a pas de deux before she is completely consumed by the flames. In the manga, Edel is portrayed as the human owner of a shop where Duck sees a ballet tutu she admires. As a gift, Edel gives her a necklace with an egg-shaped jewel, and makes her promise to come back again. There she also seems to take Drosselmeyer's place, encouraging both Princess Tutu and Princess Kraehe. In the second volume, she is revealed as plotting to revive The Raven within herself. Edel is a German term and suffix for other words, that means "noble". 
 is a toddler-like doll created by Charon (Fakir and Mytho's adoptive father) from Edel's ashes. She plays a small drum and semi-inadvertently helps Duck. However, whenever she helps Duck turn back into a girl with a splash of water, awkwardness comes for both Duck and Fakir (as ducks do not wear clothing). Uzura often adds the suffix –zura to her sentences and is very curious, fixated throughout the series on figuring out what love is. Uzura is absent in the manga. 
 is a somewhat snobbish music student at the Academy who is obsessed with Drosselmeyer and his powers. After realizing that Fakir is a descendant of Drosselmeyer, Autor becomes very interested in him and encourages him to use the reality-altering power of writing. At one point, Rue tries to seduce Autor in order to feed his heart to her father; Autor however professes he loves her. This makes Rue doubt The Raven's words that only he and the Prince could love her and conflicted, lets Autor go. He does not appear in the manga. 
 age 14-15~ height ”5”2” in, is an outspoken, tomboyish character, and one of Duck's two best friends from her class. In the second season of the anime, she is the first attempted victim of Mytho after The Raven's blood possesses him, and she almost loses her heart.  However, Tutu is able to dance with her and save her from that fate. In the manga, she is replaced by a girl named Mai. 
 age 14-16~ height ”5”4 in, Duck's other best friend from dance class, who is constantly trying to push her into a doomed relationship with Mytho and later Fakir. She tends to romanticize star-crossed lovers, gleefully anticipating any such relationship to fail. In the manga, she is replaced by a girl named Yuma. 
 is the dance teacher at the Academy. He is one of the few anthropomorphised characters from the anime to appear in the manga, and plays a similar role in both. He appears to be obsessed with marriage, and frequently threatens misbehaving female students with marrying him if they do not reform. In the anime, Mr. Cat particularly makes this threat to Duck, due to her lack of concentration during practice as well as her constant tardiness. Despite his quirks, he is a competent teacher and offers words of wisdom and advice to his students. At the end of the anime, Mr. Cat is shown as a normal cat again and paired up with a female cat, walking with their kittens. 
, an unnamed female voice that presents a short tale in the prologue before each episode that is often related to the theme of the episode's title. Her voice also narrates a few other situations, such as the split-episode previews and closing of Chapter of the Fledgling (only in the TV version, but also in the DVD extras).  (Japanese) Jennie Welch (English 1st) Marcy Bannor (English 2nd)

See also
List of Princess Tutu episodes

References

External links
 
 
 Anime Network - Princess Tutu

Characters
Lists of anime and manga characters
Magical girl anime and manga characters